Vance is an English surname.

Vance is the surname of:

People
 Alfred Vance (1839–1888), English music hall singer and songwriter
 Bob Vance (jurist) (born 1961), judge of Alabama's 10th Judicial Circuit
 Calvin B. Vance (1842–1926), American politician
 Clarice Vance (1871–1961), American vaudeville performer
 Colm Vance (born 1992), Canadian soccer player
 Courtney B. Vance (born 1960), American actor
 Cyrus Vance (1917–2002), US Secretary of State
 Cyrus Vance Jr. (born 1954), New York County District Attorney
 Danitra Vance (1954–1994), American comedian and actress
 David Vance (politician) (1836–1912), American shipmaster and politician 
 David R. Vance (born 1940), American racehorse trainer 
 Dazzy Vance (1891–1961), American baseball pitcher
 Foy Vance (born 1974), Irish musician
 J. D. Vance (born 1984), American author and venture capitalist, US Senator-elect from Ohio
 Jack Vance (1916–2013), American fantasy and science fiction writer
 Joe Vance (1905–1978), American baseball pitcher
 Jim Vance (1942–2017), American news anchor
 John Vance (MP) (died 1875), Member of Parliament for Dublin and Armagh
 Joseph Vance (Ohio politician) (1786–1852), American politician
 Joseph W. Vance (1841–1927), American military officer
 Joseph Williams Vance Jr. (1918–1942), American naval officer in World War II
 Jonathan Vance (born 1964), Canadian general, current Chief of the Defence Staff
 Leon Vance (1916–1944), American Air Force officer, US Medal of Honor recipient
 Lesley Vance (born 1977), American painter
 Margaret Shelley Vance (1925-2008), American composer
 Paul Vance (born 1929), American songwriter
 Robert Smith Vance (1931–1989), American federal judge
 Terry Vance (born 1953), American motorcycle racer, team owner, & parts manufacturer
 Tommy Vance (1941–2005), British radio broadcaster
 Vivian Vance (1909–1979), American actor and singer, known for playing Ethel on I Love Lucy
 William R. Vance (1806–1885), American mayor
 Zebulon Baird Vance (1830–1894), American politician, Governor of North Carolina, U.S. Senator and Confederate officer

Pseudonym
Ethel Vance, pseudonym of Grace Zaring Stone (1891–1981), American author
 William Vance, pseudonym of William van Cutsem (born 1935), Belgian comic book artist

Fictional characters 
 Alyx Vance, in the video game Half-Life 2
Bagger Vance, in the movie Legend of Bagger Vance
Brother Vance, A character in the game Destiny and its sequel Destiny 2
 Bob Vance, character from the U.S. TV series The Office
 Dr. Eli Vance, in the video game Half-Life 2
 Lance Vance, from the video game Grand Theft Auto: Vice City
 Leon Vance, agency director in the television show NCIS
Mary Vance, orphan from L. M. Montgomery's Rainbow Valley
Nell Vance, in the movie The Haunting
 Philo Vance, detective in several novels by S. S. Van Dine
 Victor Vance, from the video game Grand Theft Auto: Vice City

See also 
 Vance (given name)